Gyaritus bangueyensis is a species of beetle in the family Cerambycidae. It was described by Stephan von Breuning in 1958. It is known from Banguey Island.

References

Gyaritini
Beetles described in 1958